Lake Murray may refer to:

Lake Murray (Papua New Guinea), the largest lake in Papua New Guinea
Lake Murray (South Carolina), for a time the largest artificial lake in the world
Lake Murray (Oklahoma), a lake and the oldest State Park in Oklahoma
Lake Murray (California), a reservoir in San Diego

See also
Lake Murray Airport in Papua New Guinea
Lake Murray Rural LLG in Papua New Guinea
Lake Murray Country in South Carolina
Lake Murray of Richland, South Carolina
Murray Lake (disambiguation)
Murray River (disambiguation)